This is a list of winners and nominees of the Primetime Emmy Award for Outstanding Supporting Actress in a Comedy Series. In early Primetime Emmy Award ceremonies, the supporting categories were not always genre-, or even gender-, specific. Beginning with the 22nd Primetime Emmy Awards, supporting actresses in comedy have competed alone. However, these comedic performances often included actors from miniseries, telefilms, and guest performers competing against main cast competitors. Such instances are marked below:

 # – Indicates a performance in a Miniseries or Television film, prior to the category's creation
 § – Indicates a performance as a guest performer, prior to the category's creation

Winners and nominations

1950s

1960s

1970s

1980s

1990s

2000s

2010s

2020s

Superlatives

Programs with multiple wins

6 wins
 Cheers (3 consecutive, twice)
 The Mary Tyler Moore Show (consecutive)

4 wins
 Everybody Loves Raymond (3 consecutive)

3 wins
 Roseanne (consecutive)

2 wins
 3rd Rock from the Sun
 All in the Family
 The Andy Griffith Show
 Bewitched
 The Bob Cummings Show (consecutive)
 Caesar's Hour (consecutive)
 The Marvelous Mrs. Maisel (consecutive)
 M*A*S*H
 Modern Family (consecutive)
 Mom (consecutive)
 Saturday Night Live (consecutive)
 Will & Grace

Programs with multiple nominations

22 nominations
 Saturday Night Live

13 nominations
 Cheers

12 nominations
 The Mary Tyler Moore Show

10 nominations
 M*A*S*H
 Modern Family

9 nominations
 Sex and the City

8 nominations
 Bewitched
 Friends
 Will & Grace

7 nominations
 Everybody Loves Raymond
 The Golden Girls
 Newhart
 Rhoda
 Roseanne
 Seinfeld

6 nominations
 The Marvelous Mrs. Maisel
 Two and a Half Men
 Veep

5 nominations
 All in the Family
 The Bob Cummings Show
 The Jeffersons
 Murphy Brown
 Ted Lasso
 Transparent

4 nominations
 30 Rock
 The Big Bang Theory
 Cybill
 I Love Lucy

3 nominations
 3rd Rock from the Sun
 Alice
 Ben Casey
 Benson
 Caesar's Hour
 The Dick Van Dyke Show
 Glee
 GLOW
 The Jackie Gleason Show
 Mom
 Private Benjamin
 Ugly Betty
 Weeds

2 nominations
 227
 Abbott Elementary
 The Andy Griffith Show
 Archie Bunker's Place
 Arrest and Trial
 Coach
 The Cosby Show
 Curb Your Enthusiasm
 December Bride
 Desperate Housewives
 Family Ties
 Fleabag
 The George Burns and Gracie Allen Show
 Getting On
 Hacks
 Happy Days
 The John Larroquette Show
 Just Shoot Me!
 The Larry Sanders Show
 Make Room for Daddy
 Mister Peepers
 Night Court
 Nurse Jackie
 Pushing Daisies
 Room 222
 Who's the Boss?
 WKRP in Cincinnati

Performers with multiple awards

4 awards
 Rhea Perlman (3 consecutive)
 Doris Roberts (3 consecutive)
 
3 awards
 Valerie Harper (consecutive)
 Laurie Metcalf (consecutive)

2 awards
 Alex Borstein (consecutive)
 Julie Bowen (consecutive)
 Ann B. Davis (consecutive)
 Allison Janney (consecutive)
 Kristen Johnston 
 Kate McKinnon (consecutive)
 Megan Mullally 
 Bebe Neuwirth (consecutive)
 Sally Struthers
 Loretta Swit
 Betty White (consecutive)

Performers with multiple nominations

10 nominations
 Rhea Perlman
 Loretta Swit

9 nominations 
 Kate McKinnon

8 nominations 
 Megan Mullally

7 nominations
 Julia Duffy
 Estelle Getty
 Julia Louis-Dreyfus
 Doris Roberts

6 nominations
 Julie Bowen
 Anna Chlumsky
 Lisa Kudrow

5 nominations
 Kim Cattrall
 Faith Ford
 Marla Gibbs
 Jane Krakowski
 Marion Lorne
 Laurie Metcalf
 Agnes Moorehead
 Sally Struthers

4 nominations
 Christine Baranski
 Mayim Bialik
 Alex Borstein
 Ann B. Davis
 Valerie Harper
 Julie Kavner
 Audrey Meadows
 Holland Taylor
 Vivian Vance
 Sofía Vergara
 Betty White
 Kristen Wiig

3 nominations
 Eileen Brennan
 Betty Gilpin
 Polly Holliday
 Allison Janney
 Kristen Johnston
 Cloris Leachman
 Jane Lynch
 Rose Marie
 Cynthia Nixon
 Elizabeth Perkins
 Inga Swenson
 Nancy Walker
 Vanessa Williams

2 nominations
 Loni Anderson
 Jennifer Aniston
 Justine Bateman
 Bea Benaderet
 Aidy Bryant
 Pat Carroll
 Kristin Chenoweth
 Hannah Einbinder
 Georgia Engel
 Shelley Fabares
 Verna Felton
 Conchata Ferrell
 Janeane Garofalo
 Sara Gilbert
 Jean Hagen
 Jackée Harry
 Katherine Helmond
 Cheryl Hines
 Marin Hinkle
 Gaby Hoffmann
 Leslie Jones
 Judith Light
 Wendie Malick
 Anne Meara
 Niecy Nash
 Bebe Neuwirth
 Amy Poehler
 Jaime Pressly
 Marion Ross
 Cecily Strong
 Juno Temple
 Liz Torres
 Karen Valentine
 Hannah Waddingham
 Merritt Wever

See also
 Golden Globe Award for Best Supporting Actress – Series, Miniseries, or Television Film

Notes

References

Supporting Actress - Comedy Series
 
Emmy Award